Raya Hatahet (born 26 December 1989 in Amman) is a Jordanian taekwondo martial artist. At the 2012 Summer Olympics, she competed in the Women's 49 kg competition, but was eliminated in the first round.

References

Jordanian female taekwondo practitioners
1989 births
Living people
Olympic taekwondo practitioners of Jordan
Taekwondo practitioners at the 2012 Summer Olympics
Taekwondo practitioners at the 2010 Asian Games
Sportspeople from Amman
Asian Games competitors for Jordan
21st-century Jordanian women